Kohinoor is a 1960 Bollywood action adventure film produced by Dr V. N. Sinha and directed by S. U. Sunny. The film stars Dilip Kumar, Meena Kumari, Leela Chitnis and Kumkum. The film's music is by Naushad. A huge box-office success, it was the third-highest grossing Indian film of 1960. The film was blockbuster at box office.

It is said that Dilip Kumar went into depression after playing tragic roles in films such as Devdas and his psychiatrist recommended to him to do light roles. One such role that he took up was Kohinoor. Kohinoor cast Dilip Kumar and Meena Kumari to play a prince and princess of different kingdoms and was full of sword fights, songs and dances. This film is also notable for some rare comical and funny scenes by Meena Kumari, who is otherwise known as the tragedy queen. Its tone was light and it lacked the intense characterisations of their earlier films.

The film included the melodic songs "Madhuban mein Radhika Nache Re" and "Do Sitaron Ka Zameen Par Hai Milan Aaj Ki Raat".

Plot
After the passing of King Chandrabhan of Kailash Nagar, the General, Veer Singh, crowns Prince Dhivendra Pratap Bahadur Chandrabhan as the next King. Veer's wife, who has brought up Dhivendra like her own son, Surinder, would like Dhivendra to marry Princess Chandramukhi of Rajgarh. The King of Rajgarh is pleased to hear this and asks his daughter to set forth to Kailash Nagar. On the way there, she is abducted by her own General and held captive until she consents to marry him. Dhivendra rescues her and they both fall in love, but get captured by the General's men. Dhivendra is gravely injured, but manages to escape and is looked after by Rajgarh's royal dancer, Rajlaxmi, who also falls in love with him. After Dhivendra recuperates, he finds out that Chandramukhi is being held against her will at the General's castle. He sets forth to her free, but gets captured in the process. Held in chains, he is blinded by a vengeful Rajlaxmi, and Chandramukhi is given an ultimatum - either wed the General or witness the execution of Dhivendra.

Cast

Dilip Kumar - Rajkumar Dhivendra Pratap Chandrabhan   
Meena Kumari - Princess Chandramukhi  
Azim   
Bina
Leela Chitnis   
Jeevan   
Raja Kapur   
Nazir Kashmiri   
Kumar   
Kumkum  
Rekha Mallick   
Mukri   
Nissar  
Qamar   
M.Y. Shaikh  
Sood   
Tun Tun   
Uma

Soundtrack

The well acclaimed soundtrack for the movie was composed by Naushad and lyrics were penned by Shakeel Badayuni. The soundtrack became a cult favourite among music lovers for its soul stirring music compositions. The soundtrack consists of 10 songs, featuring vocals by Mohammed Rafi, Lata Mangeshkar and Asha Bhonsle. The best known song in the soundtrack is Madhuban Mein Radhika Nache Re, a classical dance song, composed on rāga Hamir and sung by Mohammed Rafi.

Awards
Filmfare Award for Best Actor for Dilip Kumar
Filmfare Best Editing Award for Moosa Mansoor

References

External links 
 

1960 films
1960s Hindi-language films
Films scored by Naushad